The Romance of the White Hair Maiden is a Hong Kong television series adapted from Liang Yusheng's novel Baifa Monü Zhuan. The series was released overseas in December 1994 before broadcasting on TVB Jade in Hong Kong in January 1995.

Cast
 Note: Some of the characters' names are in Cantonese romanisation.

Ada Choi as Lin Ngai-seung
Timmy Ho as Cheuk Yat-hong
Gary Chan as Ngok Ming-or
Chow Ching as Ho Ngok-wah
Wong Wai as Ngai Chung-yin
Newton Lai as Lei Tsi-sing
Joanna Chan as Tit San-wu
Jason Pai as Tit Fei-lung
Wu Yuet-san as Wong Chiu-hei
Joe Ma as Chu Seung-lok
Zhang Yan as Mang Chau-ha
Ma Hoi-lun as Red Flower Devil Mother
Chun Wong as Yuen Bat-kwai
Lo Mang as Fok Tin-to
Lee Kwai-ying as Ling Muk-wah
Henry Lee as Taoist Pak-shek
Kwan Ching as Kam Tuk-yee

External links

Hong Kong wuxia television series
Works based on Baifa Monü Zhuan
TVB dramas
1995 Hong Kong television series debuts
1995 Hong Kong television series endings
Television series set in the Ming dynasty
Television shows based on works by Liang Yusheng
Television series set in the 17th century